Water City is a community interest company (also knows Water City CIC) created by Andrew Mawson. It operates in the area in and around the Queen Elizabeth Olympic Park in East London and the Lower Lea Valley.

References

External links
 Water City website
 Lord Mawson's Water City Vision - Youtube
 Water City Music

Community interest companies